Osmunda regalis, or royal fern, is a species of deciduous fern, native to Europe, Africa and Asia, growing in woodland bogs and on the banks of streams. The species is sometimes known as flowering fern due to the appearance of its fertile fronds.

Names
The name Osmunda possibly derives from Osmunder, a Saxon name for the god Thor.  The name "royal fern" derives from its being one of the largest and most imposing European ferns. The name has been qualified as "old world royal fern" in some American literature to distinguish it from the closely related American royal fern, O. spectabilis. However this terminology is not found in British literature.

Description
Osmunda regalis produces separate fertile and sterile fronds. The fertile fronds are erect and shorter, 20–50 cm tall, usually with 2-3 pairs of sterile pinnae at the base, and 7-14 pairs of fertile pinnae above bearing the densely clustered sporangia.

In many areas, O. regalis has become rare as a result of wetland drainage for agriculture.

Evolution
The oldest known fossils of Osmunda date to the Paleocene, Osmunda likely derives from fossil species currently assigned to Claytosmunda.

Varieties

There are three to four varieties as traditionally construed:
Osmunda regalis var. regalis. Europe, Africa, southwest Asia. Sterile fronds to 160 cm tall.
Osmunda regalis var. panigrahiana R.D.Dixit. Southern Asia (India).
Osmunda regalis var. brasiliensis (Hook. & Grev.) Pic. Serm. Tropical regions of Central and South America; treated as a synonym of var. spectabilis by some authors.
Osmunda regalis var. spectabilis (Willdenow) A.Gray. Eastern North America. Sterile fronds to 100 cm tall. Now accepted as a separate species, Osmunda spectabilis.

Similar species
There are three very similar species, Osmunda spectabilis, Osmunda lancea and Osmunda japonica.  Recent genetic analysis (Metzgar et al., 2008) has shown that the New World varieties are in a clade that is sister to the Old World varieties of Osmunda regalis.  If this is true, then O. lancea and O. japonica should either be regarded as varieties of O. regalis, or, conversely, O. regalis var. spectabilis should be regarded as a separate species, Osmunda spectabilis Willdenow.  The var. brasiliensis would then be Osmunda spectabilis Willdenow var. brasiliensis Hooker & Greville.

Cultivation
Osmunda regalis is widely cultivated in temperate regions. The species and the cultivar 'Cristata' have both gained the Royal Horticultural Society's Award of Garden Merit. Osmunda plants should be planted in preferably acidic, moist soil, associating well with other large moisture-loving plants such as Rodgersia and Gunnera. However, it tolerates a range of soil and climatic conditions.

Other uses
The roots, along with those of other species of Osmunda, are used for the production of osmunda fibre, used as a growing medium for cultivated orchids and other epiphytic plants.

According to Slavic mythology, the sporangia, called "Perun's flowers", have assorted magical powers, such as giving their holders the ability to defeat demons, fulfill wishes, unlock secrets, and understand the language of trees.  However, collecting the sporangia is a difficult and frightening process.  In earlier traditions, they must be collected on Kupala night; later, after the arrival of Christianity, the date is changed to Easter eve.  Either way, the person wanting to collect Perun's flowers must stand within a circle drawn around the plant and withstand the taunting or threats of demons.

The young shoots of the fern are, along with the similar shoots of many other fern species, known in some places as fiddleheads, and eaten as food, thought to have an asparagus-like taste.

References

Hyde, H. A., Wade, A. E., & Harrison, S. G. (1978). Welsh Ferns. National Museum of Wales.
Metzgar, Jordan S., Judith E. Skog, Elizabeth A. Zimmer, and Kathleen M. Pryer (2008). "The Paraphyly of Osmunda is Confirmed by Phylogenetic Analyses of Seven Plastid Loci." Systematic Botany, 33(1): pp. 31–36

External links

Flora Europaea: Osmunda regalis
Flora of North America: Osmunda regalis var. spectabilis
World Fern List: Osmunda
Florida Institute for Systematic Botany: Osmunda regalis var. spectabilis (including var. brasiliensis as a synonym)

Osmundales
Plants described in 1753
Taxa named by Carl Linnaeus
Ferns of Africa
Ferns of Asia
Ferns of Europe
Garden plants of North America